
A number of signal boxes in Scotland are on the Statutory List of Buildings of Special Architectural or Historic Interest. Signal boxes house the signalman and equipment that control the railway points and signals. Originally railway signals were controlled from a hut on a platform at junctions, but by the 1860s this had developed into a raised building with a glazed upper storey, containing levers controlling points and signals. Railway companies either built  boxes to their own designs, or used the design of the signalling manufacturers, such as Stevens & Sons, McKenzie & Holland and Dutton & Co.

Listed buildings are placed in one of three categories: Category A for buildings of national or international importance, Category B for particularly important buildings of regional or more than local importance and Category C for buildings that local importance, or lesser examples of any period, style, or building type. At the end of the second world war there were more than 2,000 signal boxes in Scotland.  Network Rail published plans in 2011 to control the railway lines in Great Britain from fourteen centres within thirty years, decommissioning the remaining mechanical signal boxes, and a joint Historic Scotland and Network Rail project reviewed the signal boxes in Scotland in 2013/14.

Signal boxes

See also
Signal boxes that are listed buildings in England

Notes and references

References

Sources

Further reading

External links

Lists of listed buildings in Scotland